Jeff Borland is an Australian academic and labour economist. He is currently the Truby Williams Professor of Economics at the University of Melbourne. He received the 2020 Distinguished Fellow Award from the Economic Society of Australia.

He regularly appears in the Australian media on the topic of economics and public policy, and has published research papers on the Australian labour market, among others.

Education 
Borland completed a Bachelor of Arts and Master of Arts at the University of Melbourne, and a PhD in economics from Yale University.

He was previously a visiting professor at Harvard University as well as Head of the Department of Economics and Deputy Dean of the business faculty at University of Melbourne.

Publications 

 Borland, J. (2022). Technically unemployment now begins with a '3'. How to keep it there?
 Alexander, O., Borland, J., Charlton, A. & Singh, A. (2022). The Labour Market for Uber Drivers in Australia. AUSTRALIAN ECONOMIC REVIEW, pp. 18-, 10.1111/1467-8462.12454
 Borland, J. (2021). Labor in the Age of Finance: Pensions, Politics, and Corporations from Deindustrialization to Dodd-Frank. ECONOMIC RECORD, 97(319), pp. 565–567, 10.1111/1475-4932.12645

References 

Living people
Australian economists
Yale Graduate School of Arts and Sciences alumni
University of Melbourne alumni
Year of birth missing (living people)